Müjde also spelled as Mojdeh or Mozhdeh or مژده is a Turkish and Persian given name meaning good news for females. It is very popular in Iran, Turkey, and Azerbaijan. 

People named Müjde include:

 Müjde Ar, Turkish film actress
 Müjde Yüksel, Turkish female basketball player

Surname
 Funda Müjde, Turkish-Dutch actress

Turkish-language surnames
Turkish feminine given names